Assenheim is one of the two former municipalities that were combined to form the municipality of Hochdorf-Assenheim in Rhein-Pfalz-Kreis in Rhineland-Palatinate, Germany.  It is located in the north-eastern part of the municipality, with the Marlach river flowing through it.

History 

Until the French Revolution, Assenheim belonged to the House of Leiningen-Dagsburg. After the Congress of Vienna in 1815, Assenheim initially belonged to the Austrian Empire and then moved to the Kingdom of Bavaria in 1816. From 1886, Assenheim was part of the newly created Bezirksamts Ludwigshafen.

In 1928, Assenheim had 524 inhabitants, who lived in 109 households. Since 1938 the village has been part of the Ludwigshafen district (Landkreis Ludwigshafen), which has been called Rhein-Pfalz-Kreis since 2004. After the Second World War, Assenheim was part of the then newly formed state of Rhineland-Palatinate within the French occupation zone. On June 7, 1969, during the course of the  Assenheim was merged with the neighboring municipality of Hochdorf to form Hochdorf-Assenheim.

References

External links 
 Official Website of Dannstadt-Schauernheim, which contains Assenheim.

Rhein-Pfalz-Kreis
Former municipalities in Rhineland-Palatinate